The Republican Institute for Vocational Education (or RIPO) is a higher education institution in Minsk, Belarus. Founded in December 1992, it is managed by the Ministry of Education of the Republic of Belarus.

Structure
 3 science-methodological centres
 8 departments in the Faculty of Improvement of Skills
 centre for economic education, created with support of Germany. 
more than 200 employees work in this institute.

External links
RIPO website 

Universities in Minsk
Educational institutions established in 1992
1992 establishments in Belarus